R313 road may refer to:
 R313 road (Ireland)
 R313 road (South Africa)